The Jupiter project was to be a new high-end model of Digital Equipment Corporation (DEC)'s PDP-10 mainframe computers. This project was cancelled in 1983, as the PDP-10 was increasingly eclipsed by the VAX supermini machines (descendants of the PDP-11). DEC recognized then that the PDP-10 and VAX product lines were competing with each other  and decided to concentrate its software development effort on the more profitable VAX. The PDP-10 was finally dropped from DEC's line in 1983, following the failure of the Jupiter Project at DEC to build a viable new model.

References

External links
 Jupiter development documents at Bitsavers

DEC computers
Information technology projects